Gonzalez were a British R&B and funk band. They became well known as a backing band for touring R&B, funk, and soul stars. Their eponymous album was released in 1974 and they recorded a total of six albums before disbanding in 1986. They are best known for their 1979 single success with their worldwide disco hit "Haven't Stopped Dancing Yet."

History
The original band was formed by Godfrey McLean and Bobby Tench from Gass in 1970 and included other members of that band. It had the line-up of Tench as vocalist and guitarist, drummer Godfrey McLean, bassist Delisle Harper, and percussionist Lennox Langton. At the end of May 1970, Tench left Gonzalez to become a member of The Jeff Beck Group and the band formed a new core membership, with saxophonists Michael "Mick" Eve, Chris Mercer, Steve Gregory, Geoffrey "Bud" Beadle, keyboardist Roy Davies, and guitarist Gordon Hunte. Later George Chandler, Glen LeFleur, Cliff Lake, and Delisle Harper were included whilst simultaneously members of Olympic Runners. Vocalist Lenny Zakatek joined in 1974 and they released their first album Gonzalez (1974), which featured a heavy funk sound. This album was Queen's bassist John Deacon favourite band in the mid 1970s. Our Only Weapon Is Our Music (1975) followed, released on EMI's sister label, Capitol.

In 1976, drummer Preston Heyman joined and they and Gloria Jones supported Bob Marley on his Hammersmith Odeon Shows. In 1977, at Air Studios London they recorded Jones' song "Haven't Stopped Dancing Yet" which reached No. 26 on the Billboard Hot 100 and established a following amongst disco enthusiasts. A remix of the same song reached No. 7 on the US Club Play chart and No. 15 in the UK Singles Chart. The band's third and fourth albums, Shipwrecked and Move It to the Music, were produced by Jones. Waller joined Manfred Mann's Earth Band, while Eve, Lake, and Hunte left before their single "Ain't No Way to Treat a Lady" (1979) was released.

In 1980, after five years with the band, Lenny Zakatek left to sing vocals with the Alan Parsons Project. The band's follow-up singles and their fifth album Watch Your Step, were not successful and the group lost its major label status. Gonzalez then worked with Pye Records and concentrated on live performances, usually backing R&B, funk and soul stars, such as Freddie King. Roy Davies died in 1986 and Gonzalez disbanded.

Guitarist Cliff Lake appeared with other artists such as Doris Troy, Edwin Starr, and Chris Rea. More recently Mick Eve, Kuma Harada, Bud Beadle, Cliff Lake, Preston Heyman, and Bobby Stignac have appeared on the London music circuit.

Former members
Steve Waller - guitar and vocals.
Roy Davies - keyboards.
Viola Wills - vocals.
Sergio Castillo - drums.

Discography

Albums

Singles

References

External links

British disco groups
Musical groups established in 1970
Musical groups disestablished in 1986
English funk musical groups
British soul musical groups
British rhythm and blues musical groups